Chew is a Chinese, English or Korean surname.

Origins
As an English surname, Chew has three separate origins:
 A toponymic surname referring to a place in Billington, Lancashire. It was originally spelled Cho, from Middle English , which is possibly a descendant of Old English  meaning "fish gill".
 A toponymic surname referring to Chew Magna or Chew Stoke in Somerset.
 A nickname from Old English , which refers to smaller chattering species of crow, in particular the red-billed chough.

As a Chinese surname, Chew is a spelling of the pronunciation in different varieties of Chinese of a number of distinct surnames including the below ones, listed by their pronunciation in Mandarin Chinese:
 Zhōu, spelled Chew based on its pronunciation in the Teochew dialect of Southern Min.
 Zhào, spelled Chew based on its pronunciation in Cantonese
 Qiū or Qiú, from a variant of the Mandarin Wade–Giles spelling Ch'iu

As a Korean surname, Chew might be an alternative spelling of the surnames spelled Ju or Chu in the Revised Romanization of Korean.

Statistics
According to statistics cited by Patrick Hanks, there were 2,033 people on the island of Great Britain and 48 on the island of Ireland with the surname Chew as of 2011. In 1881 there had been 1,490 people with the surname in Great Britain, mainly in Lancashire, Yorkshire, Gloucestershire, and Bedfordshire.

The 2010 United States Census found 8,905 people with the surname Chew, making it the 3,988th-most-common name in the country. This represented an decrease in relative frequency, but an increase in absolute numbers, from 8,516 (3,831st-most-common) in the 2000 Census. In both censuses, about four-tenths of the bearers of the surname identified as Asian, four-tenths as White, and 15% as Black. It was the 310th-most-common surname among respondents to the 2000 Census who identified as Asian.

People

Notable people with the surname include:

Academia
 Chew Chin Hin, Singaporean physician
 Geoffrey Chew (musicologist), British musicologist
 Geoffrey Chew (1924–2019), American theoretical physicist
 Chew Kheng Chuan (born 1957), Singaporean academic administrator
 Lock Yue Chew, Singaporean physicist
 Wee-Lek Chew (born 1932), Singaporean-born botanist

Film and television
 Chew Chor Meng (born 1968), Singaporean actor
 Richard Chew (born 1940), American cinematographer
 Robert F. Chew (1960–2013), American actor
 Sam Chew Jr., American actor

Government, politics, and military
 Ada Nield Chew (1870–1945), British suffragist
 Benjamin Chew (1722–1810), American jurist
 Betty Chew (born 1964), Malaysian politician
 Beverly Chew (1773–1851), American merchant and diplomat
 Charles Chew (1922–1986), American politician

 Henry F. Chew (1837–1918), American colonel in the American Civil War and New Jersey dentist
 Chew Men Leong, Singaporean civil servant and naval admiral
 R. Preston Chew (1843–1921), Confederate officer in the American Civil War and West Virginia businessman
 Samuel Chew (captain) ( – 1778), captain in the American Continental Navy
 Samuel Chew (justice) (1699–1744), Chief Justice of colonial Delaware
 Scott Chew, American politician in Utah
 Sue Chew, American politician in Idaho
 Chew Swee Kee (1918–1985), Singaporean politician

Musicians
 Hans Chew (born 1975), American pianist
 Chew Jun Ru, Singaporean erhu player
 Ray Chew (born ), American jazz musician
 Chew Sin Huey (born 1981), Malaysian pop singer

Sport
 Chew Choon Eng (born 1976), Malaysian badminton player
 Danny Chew (born 1962), American cyclist
 Fleur Chew (born 1981), Australian rower
 Jack Chew (1915–1984), English football full back
 Jackie Chew (1920–2002), English football winger
 Jennifer Chew (born 1983), American Paralympic wheelchair basketball player
 Danny Chew Ji Xiang (born 1987), Singaporean football defender
 Michael Chew (born 1962), Malaysian field hockey player
 Phillip Chew (born 1994), American badminton player, brother of Ryan Chew
 Chew Pok Cheong (born 1970), Malaysian cricketer
 Ryan Chew (born 1996), American badminton player, brother of Phillip Chew
 Chew Yiwei (born 1995), Malaysian diver

Other
 Chew Choon Seng, Singaporean businessman
 Dennis Chew (born 1973), Singaporean radio host
 Donevan Chew, Malaysian advertising director
 Elim Chew (born 1966), Singaporean clothing businesswoman
 Emily Chew, American ophthalmologist
 Chew Gek Khim (born 1961), Singaporean businesswoman
 Chew Hoong Ling (born 1980), Malaysian writer and inspirational speaker
 John Chew (born 1947), Singaporean Anglican priest
 Paddy Chew (1960–1999), Singaporean with AIDS
 Ron Chew (born 1953), American community organizer
 Ruth Chew (1920–2010), American children's writer

See also
 Chew (disambiguation)
 Ng Poon Chew (1866–1931), Chinese-American writer and publisher (surname Ng, given name Poon Chew)

References

English-language surnames
Chinese-language surnames
Hokkien-language surnames
Korean-language surnames
Multiple Chinese surnames